Dniprovskyi District or Dniprovskyi Raion, is a name of several urban districts in Ukraine:

 Dniprovskyi District, Kamianske
 Dniprovskyi District, Kyiv
 Dniprovskyi District, Kherson
 Dniprovskyi District, Zaporizhia

See also

 Kamianka-Dniprovska Raion, Zaporizhzhia Oblast, Ukraine
 Dniprovske district, Kamianske Raion, Dnipropetrovsk Oblast, Ukraine
 Dnipro Raion, Dnipropetrovsk Oblast, Ukraine
 Dnipro Dnipropetrovsk (disambiguation)
 Dnipropetrovsk (disambiguation)
 Dnipro (disambiguation)